Leptomys arfakensis is a species of rodent in the family of Muridae. It is found in the Arfak Mountains of West Papua, Indonesia.

References

Musser, G.G.; Helgen, K.M.; Lunde, D.P. 2008. Systematic review of New Guinea Leptomys (Muridae, Murinae) with descriptions of two new species. American Museum Novitates

Leptomys
Mammals described in 2008